The 2020 WK League was the twelfth season of the WK League, the top division of women's football in South Korea. The regular season ran from 15 June to 15 October 2020. Due to the COVID-19 pandemic, the total amount of rounds were reduced from 28 to 21.

Incheon Hyundai Steel Red Angels won the title for the eight consecutive season after defeating Gyeongju KHNP in the final. Before the season, Gumi Sportstoto relocated to the city of Sejong.

Teams

Foreign players
The total number of foreign players was restricted to three per club, including a slot for a player from the Asian Football Confederation countries. Boeun Sangmu were not allowed to sign any foreign players due to their military status.

League table

Results

Matches 1 to 14

Matches 15 to 21

Play-offs
The semi-final was played as a single-elimination match, and the Championship Final over two legs.

Semi-final

Championship final
First leg

Second leg

Season's statistics

Top scorers

References

External links
WK League official website
WK League on Soccerway

2020
Women
South Korea
South Korea